Sahti is a Finnish type of farmhouse ale made from malted and unmalted grains including barley and rye. Traditionally the beer is flavored with juniper in addition to, or instead of, hops; the mash is filtered through juniper twigs into a trough-shaped tun, called a kuurna in Finnish. Sahti is top-fermented and many have a banana flavor due to isoamyl acetate from the use of baking yeast, although ale yeast may also be used in fermenting.

The end product is a cloudy beer with  phenolic flavors and a distinct taste similar to banana, balanced by the bitterness from the juniper branches. The carbonation level tends to be very low. Sahti was traditionally brewed as a farmhouse ale, but commercial versions are now available. Commercial sahti is usually 8% ABV. In Finland, due to the higher percentage of alcohol in sahti, it is only sold in commercial sahti breweries, pubs or state-owned Alko stores, not in regular markets or grocery stores. Sahti has to be stored cold until consumption and is therefore not available in all Alko branches.

Within Finland, sahti has differing characteristics depending on which part of the country it is from. It is often known as Tavastian beer from Häme (well-known sahti areas, such as Sysmä, Joutsa, Kuhmoinen and Lammi, are in Häme) but it is also made in Finland Proper and some parts of Central Finland. Every year the Finnish sahti brewing championship is held on the first weekend in August.

Brewing process 
Traditionally, the most common sahti brewing process is using a long step infusion mash that may last up to six hours, after which the wort is lautered through the kuurna. Unlike most beers, traditional sahti wort goes straight from the lauter tun to the fermenter without boiling. 

However, this is only one of several brewing processes that have traditionally been used. Sahti has also been brewed as a stone beer, with infusion mashing, with variants of decoction mashing, by boiling the mash in the kettle, and so on. Some regions of Finland have called their farmhouse ale taari, and in these areas different brewing processes appear to have been used, such as fermenting in the mash, and baking the wet malts in bread-like shapes before lautering.

Commercial sahti brands 

 Kellarin Varastopanimo Joutsa: Varastopanimon Sahti
 Panimoravintola Beer Hunter's: Mufloni Sahti (from Pori)
 Finlandia Sahti and Finlandia Strong Sahti (from Sastamala)
 Hartolan Sahti, known as Krouvin Sahti and Punakallion Sahti.
 Hollolan Hirvi Kivisahti
 Huvila sahti (from Savonlinna)
 Joutsan Sahti
 Lammin Sahti (from Lammi)
 Tiinan Sahti (from Sysmä)
 Stadin Panimo: Stadin Sahti (from Helsinki)

In other countries 

A farmhouse ale that in some cases is similar is brewed on the Swedish island of Gotland (known as Gotlandsdricka). An even closer relative in terms of flavour is a farmhouse ale known as "koduõlu", brewed on the Estonian islands in the Baltic. 

In Estonia one commercial beer is sometimes described as "Estonian sahti", despite actually being an Estonian koduõlu:

 Pihtla Õlu from Pihtla õlleköök, Estonia

Finnish sahti has protected status in Europe., so that in order to be described as sahti a beer must be brewed following something close to the traditional process and ingredients. Modern craft beer versions of sahti can be somewhat removed from the original style, because brewers may use more hops, might not use juniper twigs, could introduce more carbonation, boil the wort, and may not use Finnish baking yeast.

In many countries sahti has been the subject of recent interest by homebrewers and microbreweries who have brewed many takes on the style. It is not clear if any of them actually resemble the original Finnish sahti beers in any way, so in the EU most of these beers could not be marketed as sahti. 

Other versions:

 Mad Scientist #19 from Sixpoint Brewing
 Samuel Adams: Norse Legend sahti (from Boston, Massachusetts, U.S.)
 Dogfish Head Brewery: Sah'tea (from Milton, Delaware, U.S.) made with masala chai and juniper berries
 Sahti Ale - New Belgium Brewing Company (from Fort Collins, Colorado, U.S.)
 Parallel 49 Brewing Company "Sahti Claws"
 Sahti - Gambling Man Brewing Company, UK (The first true Sahti to be commercially brewed in the UK)
 Ale Apothecary - "Sahati," a mixed fermentation ale lautered in a spruce kuurna with spruce branches
 Browar Pinta - "Koniec Świata" (pol. "The End of The World, owes its name to the date of its release to the market, which was supposed to be the end of the world), polish attempt of brewing Sahti beer. Made with juniper berries and branches.
 Bare Bear from Off Color Brewing
 Sahti - Kiitos Brewing, Salt Lake City Utah
 Ivar the Boneless - Proper Brewing, Salt Lake City Utah
 Löyly - HammerHeart Brewing Company, Lino Lakes Minnesota
 Ymir the Creator from High Ground Brewing in Terra Alta, WV
 Mānuka Sahti - Kererū Brewing, NZ
 Bushcrafter Sahti - Prairie Pride Brewing in Grand Island, NE
 Sauna Brau - Turnagain Brewing in Anchorage, AK
 Finnish Line - Independent Brewing in Bel Air, MD

See also

 Finnish beverages

References

Finnish alcoholic drinks
Types of beer
Beer in Finland
Traditional Speciality Guaranteed products from Finland